Isny im Allgäu (Low Alemannic: Isny im Allgai) is a town in south-eastern Baden-Württemberg, Germany. It is part of the district of Ravensburg, in the western, Württembergish part of the Allgäu region.

Isny was a Free Imperial City (Freie Reichsstadt) until the mediatisation of 1803.

History

During the three centuries following its origin in 1042, it was a commercial center controlled and exploited by various competing feudal lords. In the 13th century, Isny's merchants built a fortification system to protect the town from marauders and rival feudal rulers. The town is still partially surrounded by the city walls and moat that were built during these early turbulent times.

After three centuries of domination by feudal lords and territorial rulers, Isny's middle class was able to purchase the town's independence in 1365. Isny's status as an Imperial city made it a self-governing republic in which the city government was elected by propertied residents and in which the guild system thrived. In 1529, Isny's Protestant minority took the city council and voted to make the town Protestant and the Nikolaikirche became the town's main Protestant church. In 1803, the city was mediatized and became a possession of the Counts of Quadt. In 1806, the city passed to the Kingdom of Württemberg, which allowed the Catholic majority to once again move to the city. In 1889, the majority of urban residents was Catholic (1139 ev / 1444 Cath.).

Isny enjoyed a vibrant economy, based primarily on linen production, until competition from abroad, the devastation of the Thirty Years' War, and a series of fires and plagues brought production to a halt in the 17th century. The town experienced a revival after the end of World War II, when a rehabilitation center for war veterans was established there. Isny emerged from the war largely undamaged, and has since become a popular destination for vacationers and resort-goers.

In the late 1970s, the town commissioned the renowned graphic designer Otl Aicher to create a graphic identity for its tourist board. Aicher responded with a set of 128 black and white pictograms which, while initially controversial, are now regarded as forward thinking and are still used to promote the town.

International relations

Isny im Allgäu is twinned with:
  Andrychów, Poland
  Notre-Dame-de-Gravenchon, Seine-Maritime, France
  Street, Somerset, United Kingdom
  Flawil, St Gallen, Switzerland
  Sotkamo, Oulu, Finland

Sons and daughters of the town
 1835, November 26 Wilhelm von Waldburg-Zeil, who was born in Neutrauchburg, † July 20, 1906 Schloss Zeil, politician, member of parliament
 1839, April 1, Constantin von Waldburg-Zeil, who was born in Neutrauchburg, † March 25, 1905 in Merano, politician, member of parliament
 1841, December 18,Karl Graf von Waldburg-Zeil, † January 30, 1890 on Castle Syrgenstein Explorer
 1845, October 17, Franz Ehrle, † March 31, 1934 in Rome, Jesuit and Cardinal of the Roman Catholic Church
 1865, October 5, Hubert Netzer, † 15 October 1939 sculptor and academy professor
 1866, November 19, Jacob Binder, † March 6, 1932, politician (SPD) MdR
 1869, September 4, Eugen Felle, † 1934 postcard painter
 1887, January 6, Eugene of Quadt to Wykradt and Isny, † October 19, 1940 in Isny, politicians (BVP) MdR, Bavarian economy Minister
 1931, May 24, Ernst Mutschler, pharmacologist
 1932, April 6, Günter Herburger, writer
 1946, May 17, Hartmut Krebs, September 29th 2007, politician (SPD), secretary of state and entrepreneur
 1948, February 28, Friedrich Hechelmann, painter
 1948, Karl Immler, entrepreneur and philanthropist
 1950, Jakob Immler, entrepreneur and philanthropist
 1962, April 30, Roberto Capitoni, German-Italian comedian
 1962, June 26, Peter Rohwein, German champion ski jumper, former German ski coach
 1968 January 4, Roland Pfaus, Actor
 1969, June 17, Peter Rist, crooner
 1976, Daniel Mark Eberhard, a music teacher and jazz musician.
 1976, Manuel Ochsenreiter, journalist
 1979, June 5, Eva Stotz, documentary film maker and director
 1991, January 12, Robin Lässer, motorcycle racer and German Champion

See also
Natural Science and Technical Academy Isny

References

External links

 Isny Tourist website 
 Photographs of Isny

Towns in Baden-Württemberg
Ravensburg (district)
Württemberg
Free imperial cities
Swabian Circle
Swabian League